Israeli Elite Force (iEF) is a hacktivism group founded two days before OpIsrael on April 5, 2013, that is responsible for multiple high-profile computer attacks and large scale online vandalism. Targets include ISPs, domain registrars, commercial websites, educational institutions, and government agencies. The group's core members are: mitziyahu, Buddhax, amenefus, bl4z3, r3str1ct3d, Mute, Cyb3rS74r, Oshrio, Aph3x, xxtr, Kavim, md5c, Cpt|Sparrow, gal-, gr1sha, nyxman and TheGodOfHell.

Views 
The group is led by Mitziyahu, naming himself co-ordinator, instead of leader. Stating in interviews for The Daily Beast, Israeli Channel 2 News, and more, that the mission of the iEF is to regain the Israeli citizen confidence of their hackers.

OpIsrael Opposition 

OpIsrael was a coordinated cyberattack by anti-Israel groups and individuals against websites they perceived as Israeli, chiefly through denial-of-service attacks. Timed for 7 April 2013, the eve of Holocaust Remembrance Day, its stated goal was to "erase Israel from the internet". Israeli Elite Force had an early start forming two days prior to the attack, taking down websites.

OpBirthControl - OpIsraelBirthday opposition 
Upon planning of the OpIsraelBirthday by anti-Israeli teams on April 7, 2014, iEF launched OpBirthControl, having several groups and individuals joining them.

On this op the Israeli Elite Force decided to focus its energy on exposing participants of the anti-Israel hacks.  The iEF hacked named Buddhax published a PDF document with a list of hackers and personal information including pictures of them taken from their computers. The PDF document has created a "buzz" being twitted by famous hacker The Jester, and celebrity Roseanne Barr, and being talked about in the media. The group also released 45,000 usernames and passwords of government officials at the Gaza Ministry of Health

References

Hacker groups